Love Me If You Dare (Chinese: 他来了，请闭眼) is a 2015 Chinese television series that is adapted from Ding Mo's novel of the same name published in July 2014. The series is produced by Kong Sheng and Hou Hongliang, with the screenplay written by Hai Yan. It stars Wallace Huo, Sandra Ma, Zhang Luyi, Wang Kai and Yin Zheng. The drama was aired simultaneously on Sohu and Dragon TV from 15 October 2015 to 4 January 2016.

The drama was praised for its storyline and character development, rating 9.6 out of 10 on viki.com with a significant following abroad, becoming one of the highest rated television series on Viki.

Synopsis
Simon/Jin Yan (Wallace Huo) is a psychologist who returns to China from the US after a close encounter with a serial killer, but his ordeal is not over yet. Together with his assistant, Jenny/Jian Yao (Sandra Ma), police officer Li Xunran (Wang Kai), and friend Fu Ziyu (Yin Zheng) they solve mysterious and violent criminal cases.

Cast

Ratings 

 Highest ratings are marked in red, lowest ratings are marked in blue

Awards and nominations

References

External links
 Love Me If You Dare official Weibo

Television shows based on works by Ding Mo
Chinese crime television series
2015 Chinese television series debuts
Dragon Television original programming
Television series by Daylight Entertainment
Television series by SMG Pictures